Duncan Standon Ironmonger AM (born 12 October 1931) is an Australian household economist. He  is an Honorary Principal Fellow and Associate Professor of the Households Research Unit, Department of Economics, University of Melbourne.

Ironmonger was born in Yass, and finished his schooling at Canberra Grammar School.  He worked for the Australian Bureau of Statistics, then studied at the University of Cambridge.  He returned to the ABS to contribute to the creation of a system for reporting the national accounts, them worked at the Melbourne Institute.

In 2013 he was made a Member of the Order of Australia.

References

Australian economists
Living people
1931 births
Academic staff of the University of Melbourne
Members of the Order of Australia
People educated at Canberra Grammar School